Noel Sikhosana (born 27 October 1965) is a Zambian retired footballer. He was the first African player to play in Poland.

References

External links
 

Living people
1965 births
Zambian footballers
Association football forwards
Kabwe Warriors F.C. players
Jomo Cosmos F.C. players
Bidvest Wits F.C. players
Wisła Kraków players
Dynamos F.C. (South Africa) players
Ekstraklasa players
Zambian expatriate footballers
Zambian expatriate sportspeople in Poland
Expatriate footballers in Poland